Hosmer may refer to:

Places
Hosmer, South Dakota, United States
Hosmer's Grove, Maui, Hawaii, United States
Mount Hosmer (disambiguation)
Hosmer, British Columbia, Canada

Other uses
Hosmer (surname)
Charles Hosmer Morse Museum of American Art, a museum in Orange County, Florida
Hosmer Mountain Soda, a soft-drink producer based in Connecticut
Hosmer Angel, a fictional character in a Sherlock Holmes story by Sir Arthur Conan Doyle